The Museo Camilo Egas is an Ecuadorian art museum about the modernist painter Camilo Egas. It was established in 1980 and is located in Quito, Ecuador.

References

See also 
 List of museums in Ecuador

Museums in Quito
Art museums established in 1980
Art museums and galleries in Ecuador